Ernest Lou Medina (August 27, 1936 – May 8, 2018) was a captain of infantry in the United States Army. He served during the Vietnam War. He was the commanding officer of Company C, 1st Battalion, 20th Infantry of the 11th Brigade, Americal Division, the unit responsible for the My Lai Massacre of 16 March 1968. He was court-martialed in 1971 for his role in that war crime, but acquitted the same year.

Background
Ernest Medina was born on August 27, 1936 into a Mexican-American family in Springer, New Mexico. After a variety of post–high school odd jobs, Medina joined the Army in 1956. He served 12 years in the enlisted ranks (including his time in the National Guard) before being commissioned through Officer Candidate School in 1964. Awarded both the Silver Star and Bronze Star Medal, Medina was promoted to captain in 1966 and was given command of Charlie Company, Americal Division in Hawaii, prior to its deployment to Vietnam.

Court-martial
According to the 1970 investigation by General William R. Peers, Medina:

 "Planned, ordered, and supervised the execution by his company of an unlawful operation against inhabited hamlets in Son My village, which included the destruction of houses by burning, killing of livestock, and the destruction of crops and other foodstuffs, and the closing of wells; and impliedly directed the killing of any persons found there."
 "Possibly killed as many as three noncombatants in My Lai."

Medina was court-martialed in 1971 for willingly allowing his men to murder noncombatants. Medina denied all the charges and claimed that he never gave any orders to kill Vietnamese noncombatants.

Medina's defense team, led by F. Lee Bailey, and a support staff that included Gary Myers, alleged that his men killed Vietnamese noncombatants under their own volition and not under Medina's orders. Medina also testified that he did not become aware that his troops were out of control at My Lai until the massacre was already well underway.

Medina also strongly denied killing any Vietnamese noncombatant at My Lai, with the exception of a young woman whom two soldiers testified that they found hiding in a ditch. When she emerged with her hands up, Medina shot her because, he claimed, he thought she had a grenade. In fact, she was unarmed. The defense lawyers brought up many incidents during the Vietnam War of Viet Cong suspects and sympathizers faking surrender to use hidden pistols or grenades to harm or kill American military personnel.

However, a helicopter crew in the area that day would have a different accounting of Medina's actions.  A 3-man crew consisting of WO1 Hugh Thompson, Crew Chief Spec 4 Glenn Andreotta & Gunner Lawrence Colburn witnessed the following at the Son My village. Per Lawrence Colburn:  "Then we saw a young girl about twenty years old lying on the grass. We could see that she was unarmed and wounded in the chest. We marked her with smoke because we saw a squad not too far away. The smoke was green, meaning it's safe to approach. Red would have meant the opposite. We were hovering six feet off the ground not more than twenty feet away when Captain Medina came over, kicked her, stepped back, and finished her off. He did it right in front of us. When we saw Medina do that, it clicked. It was our guys doing the killing."

In August 1971, Medina was ultimately found not guilty of all charges. His jury deliberations lasted about  60 minutes.

Despite his acquittal, the court martial and negative publicity brought Medina's military career to an end. He resigned his commission and left the Army shortly afterward. He later admitted that, during his court martial, he had "not been completely candid to avoid disgracing the military, the United States, his family, and himself."

After the military
After resigning from the Army, Medina went to work at an Enstrom Helicopter Corporation plant owned by F. Lee Bailey in Menominee, Michigan. Medina moved with his family to Marinette, Wisconsin. He worked in his family's real estate business: Medina, Inc. Realtor in Marinette, Wisconsin. He died on May 8, 2018, at the age of 81.

Cultural references
Medina is mentioned by name in the first stanza of Pete Seeger's Vietnam protest song "Last Train to Nuremberg" (1970).
Do I see Lieutenant Calley?  Do I see Captain Medina?  Do I see Gen'ral Koster and all his crew?

Decorations
Here is the ribbon bar of Captain Medina:

See also

 Medina standard

References

External links

 Hugh Thompson Foundation web site: (501(c)(3) nonprofit founded by Lawrence Colburn in honor of Hugh Thompson
  Biography of Ernest Medina
 Court Martial Documents
 Trial Transcript
 INTO THE DARK: THE My Lai Massacre
 Ernest Medina Trial Watch
 Famous American Trials - My Lai Courts Martial 1970 
  Word of Honor, Nelson DeMille 1985.

1936 births
2018 deaths
American mass murderers
American people of Mexican descent
United States Army personnel of the Vietnam War
Military personnel from New Mexico
Mỹ Lai massacre
United States Army officers
United States Army personnel who were court-martialed
People acquitted of international crimes
People from Springer, New Mexico
People from Marinette, Wisconsin
Businesspeople from Wisconsin
Recipients of the Silver Star
War criminals